Archie Fletcher (April 24, 1890 – unknown) was an American Tin Pan Alley songwriter and music publisher, who made his mark during the first half of the 20th century. He was born in Philadelphia, Pennsylvania.

Songwriting credits

 1918 - "When Tony Goes Over the Top", words by Billy Frisch and Archie Fletcher, music by Alex Marr
 1925 - "Roll 'Em Girls", words and music by Archie Fletcher and Bobby Heath
 1937 - "On a Little Bamboo Bridge", words by Archie Fletcher, music by Al Sherman

Year of death missing
Place of birth missing
Songwriters from Pennsylvania
1890 births